Sammy Andre Bossut (born 11 August 1985) is a Belgian professional footballer who plays as a goalkeeper for Zulte Waregem in the Belgian Pro League. 

He was a first team surprise in the 2006–07 UEFA Cup return against Newcastle United, in St James' Park.

At the end of the 2007-08 season, Zulte Waregem chose not to prolong the contract of Geert De Vlieger, who was until then first choice goalkeeper. Bossut started the last matches of that season to gain more first team experience. Instead of signing a new goalkeeper, Bossut was awarded his spot in the starting eleven for the 2008–09 season.

International career
After Silvio Proto got injured, national manager Marc Wilmots called up Bossut as potential third goalkeeper for the Belgium national football team at the 2014 FIFA World Cup. Bossut played his first game with the national team against Luxembourg on 26 May 2014. Though considered official by the Royal Belgian Football Association, FIFA did not recognise the match as Wilmots made 7 substitutions while only 6 are allowed in international friendlies.

Honours
Zulte Waregem
 Belgian Cup: 2017

References

External links
 Sammy Bossut player info at the official Zulte Waregem website 
 Sammy Bossut player info at sporza.be 
 Profile at Belgian Soccer Database 

1985 births
Living people
Belgian footballers
Association football goalkeepers
S.V. Zulte Waregem players
Belgian Pro League players
Challenger Pro League players
Footballers from West Flanders
Flemish sportspeople
2014 FIFA World Cup players
Belgium international footballers